The Grip of Iron is a 1920 British silent crime film directed by Bert Haldane and starring George Foley, Malvina Longfellow and James Lindsay. It was based on a play of the same title by Arthur Shirley, which was in turn based on a novel by Adolphe Belot. A Parisian lawyer's clerk robs and strangles a series of victims in order to fund his daughter's extravagant lifestyle.

Cast
 George Foley as Jagon / Simonnet  
 Malvina Longfellow as Cora Jager  
 James Lindsay as Lorenz de Rifas  
 Laurence Tessier as Paul Blanchard 
 Ronald Power as Captain Guerin 
 Ivy King as Marie Guerin  
 Warwick Buckland as Rolf De Belfort  
 John Power as Coucou  
 Moore Marriott as Smiler

References

Bibliography
 Low, Rachael. History of the British Film, 1918-1929. George Allen & Unwin, 1971.

External links

1920 films
1920 crime films
British silent feature films
British crime films
Films directed by Bert Haldane
Films set in Paris
British black-and-white films
1920s English-language films
1920s British films